The Turiec is a river in southern Slovakia. It is a right tributary to the Sajó, into which it flows near the town of Tornaľa.

References

Rivers of Slovakia